Harps Food Stores, Inc., based in Springdale, Arkansas, is a local chain of 114 supermarkets located across Arkansas, Oklahoma, Missouri, and Kansas.
The company sells both groceries and sporting goods in some larger stores, with several locations also incorporating pharmacies and fuel centers. In addition to its flagship brand, the company also operates grocery stores under four banners:  Food4Less, in southwest Missouri; CashSaver in Tulsa; 10Box Cost-Plus; and Warehouse Market in Tulsa. The company additionally operates a franchise of Ace Hardware in Charleston, Arkansas.

History
Harps Food Stores was founded by Harvard and Floy Harp in 1930.  In 2001, Harps became employee-owned after buying company shares from the Harp family.  The stores are supplied by Kansas City, Kansas-based Associated Wholesale Grocers. The company is valued around $550 million, and employed 5,300 people as of 2020. The company announced plans on March 11, 2020, to expand further throughout northern Arkansas and southeastern Missouri, with an acquisition of 20 additional store locations from Fredericktown, Missouri-based Town and Country Grocers.

Locations (as of 3/7/2022)

Arkansas
 Alma
 Bald Knob
 Batesville
 Bellefonte
 Bella Vista
 Benton
 Bentonville
 Bull Shoals
 Cabot
 Calico Rock
 Centerton
 Clarksville
 Conway
 Dover
 Elkins
 Fayetteville
 Fort Smith
 Gentry
 Gravette
 Green Forest
 Greenbrier
 Harrison
 Haskell
 Heber Springs
 Hot Springs
 Huntsville
 Jasper
 Jonesboro
 Lincoln
 Lowell
 Marshall
 Mayflower
 Morrilton
 Mountain Home
 Mountain View
 Perryville
 Pocahontas
 Prairie Grove
 Rector
 Rogers
 Searcy
 Siloam Springs
 Springdale
 Van Buren
 Vilonia
 Waldron
 West Fork
 Yellville

Kansas
 De Soto

Missouri
 Alton
 Anderson
 Bernie
 Dexter
 Doniphan
 Joplin
 Malden
 Noel
 Poplar Bluff
 Richmond
 Seligman
 Thayer
 Farmington

Oklahoma
 Chelsea
 Fort Gibson
 Gore
 Grove
 Harrah
 Inola
 Locust Grove
 Norman
 Poteau
 Salina
 Stilwell
 Vian
 Westville

References

External links
 Harps Food Stores
 Associated Wholesale Grocers

Companies based in Arkansas
1930 establishments in Arkansas
Supermarkets of the United States
Springdale, Arkansas
Retail companies established in 1930

Employee-owned companies of the United States
Grocers